Brandon Harris (born October 12, 1995) is a former American football quarterback for the LSU Tigers and North Carolina Tar Heels.

Early years
Harris attended Parkway High School in Bossier City, Louisiana. While at Parkway, he played for the football team. He was ranked by Rivals.com as a four-star recruit and the fifth best dual-threat quarterback in his class. Harris led Parkway High School undefeated all on the road during playoffs to the LHSAA 5A state championship in New Orleans, Louisiana, in Fall 2013. Harris committed to play college football at Louisiana State University in July 2013.

College career
At LSU, Harris competed with Anthony Jennings for the Tigers starting job as a true freshman in 2014. Jennings would win the job, but Harris still earned playing time as the backup. On September 29, Harris was named the starter over Jennings for the team's sixth game against Auburn. In the 2014 season, he finished with 452 passing yards, six passing touchdowns, and two interceptions in eight games. In the 2015 season, he finished with 2,165 passing yards, 13 touchdowns, and six interceptions. In the 2016 season, he only appeared in two games.

On March 26, 2017, Harris decided to transfer to the University of North Carolina in order to continue his collegiate career. He competed with Chazz Surratt and Nathan Elliott to be the starter. In his lone season with the Tar Heels, he had 346 passing yards, one passing touchdown, and eight interceptions in six games.

References

1995 births
Living people
American football quarterbacks
LSU Tigers football players
North Carolina Tar Heels football players
Sportspeople from Bossier City, Louisiana
Players of American football from Louisiana